Yangtse Gewog (Dzongkha: གཡང་རྩེ་) is a gewog (village block) of Trashiyangtse District, Bhutan. It was formerly known as Trashiyangtse.

Religious sites include Chortencora and Old Dzong or Dongdhi Dzong.

References

Gewogs of Bhutan
Trashiyangtse District